Matthew Mullins is an American actor and martial artist. At the age of 16, in 2000, he won his first World Kickboxing Association title in Dublin, Ireland. This would be his first of five championships in the next three years.

Martial arts career
Mullins was featured in the Discovery Channel mini-series Extreme Martial Arts alongside Mike Chat. As of 2006, he holds a 4th degree Black belt in the style Shōrei-ryū and studies under martial arts instructor John Sharkey at Sharkey's Karate Studio in Naperville, Illinois.

While an underbelt, he met Mike Chaturantabut and together they created a martial arts style which later became known as Extreme Martial Arts (XMA).  Their style's growing popularity prompted the Discovery Channel to produce a documentary called XMA: Extreme Martial Arts. In this documentary, the producers covered the XMA style with modern technology such as motion-capture and 3D imaging to show how a martial artist can use his body. As a side story, they focused on Matt Mullins' attempt to come back to the competition world of sport karate.

Mullins holds seminars and martial arts camps. He appeared on shows such as The Jerry Lewis Telethon, The Wayne Brady Show, America's Got Talent (Season 2) and The Ellen DeGeneres Show, as well as sporting events, live action shows and karate tournaments.

Acting career
Mullins has appeared in national commercials for Motorola, America Online, Applebee's, Nike, Hanes and Pepsi as well as a lead actor in several films including Kung Fu Love Triangle, Bloodfist 2050, and Adventures of Johnny Tao: Rock Around the Dragon. He had a lead role portraying the character Len/Kamen Rider Wing Knight on the in-production TV show Kamen Rider: Dragon Knight. He also helped Mike Moh get the role of Hunt/Danny Cho/Kamen Rider Axe in the same show through their shared martial arts training.

Mullins was a reporter for LX TV 1st Look television program introducing DJ Hapa, as well as Shinkendo. He starred as Johnny Cage in the Kevin Tancharoen directed short film Mortal Kombat: Rebirth.

Filmography

Films
 Wentworth (2005) – Waiter
 Adventures of Johnny Tao: Rock Around the Dragon (2007) – Eddie
 Blood and Bone (2009) – Pretty Boy Price
 Freshmyn (2010) – Zach Markey
 Mortal Kombat: Rebirth (2010) – Johnny Cage
 Alpha Must Die (2012) - Blue
 The Wrath of Vajra (2013) - K-23/Bill
 Resident Evil: Vengeance (2013) - Chris Redfield
 Divergent (2014) - Fighter on Ring
 White Tiger (2015) - Michael Turner

Stunt work
 Ted Bundy (2002) – as Michael Reilly Burke's stunt double
 No Rules (2005) – as brotherhood fighter
 Severed (2009) – as fight choreographer
 Agents of S.H.I.E.L.D. (2014) - as fight coordinator
 Masterless (2015) - as stunt coordinator
 Defenders (2017) - as stunt coordinator
 Luke Cage (season 2)  (2018) - as fight coordinator

Video games
 Area 51 (1996) – Voice
 Tao Feng: Fist of the Lotus (2003) – Voice
 The Lord of the Rings: The Battle for Middle-Earth (2004) – Voice
 Uncharted: Drake's Fortune (2007) – Motion Capture: Nathan Drake
 Resident Evil 5 (2009) – Face Model: Chris Redfield
 Resident Evil 6 (2012) – Face Model: Chris Redfield

Television
 America's Got Talent (2007) – Himself – Performer
 Kamen Rider: Dragon Knight (2008–2009) – Len / Kamen Rider Wing Knight (Main Role)
 Misadventures in Matchmaking (2009) - Cobin in The Love Portal
 Mortal Kombat: Legacy (2011) – Johnny Cage
 Team Unicorn (2011) - Beach Stud in Alien Beach Crashers
 Kickin' It (2012) - Trent Darby in It Takes Two To Tangle
 Métal Hurlant Chronicles (2012) - Julian in King's Crown
 Agents of S.H.I.E.L.D. (2014) - Centipede Soldier in The Magical Place

Director
The Johnnies - 5 episodes

Producer
Resident Evil: Vengeance (2013)
The Johnnies - 5 episodes

References

External links
 
 
 Sideswipe Performance Team Official Website
 NERDSociety – Interview with Matt Mullins

Living people
Sportspeople from Naperville, Illinois
American martial artists
American male karateka
People from Euclid, Ohio
America's Got Talent contestants
American stunt performers
Year of birth missing (living people)